Fulda lucida is a species of butterfly in the family Hesperiidae. It is found along the north-western coast of Madagascar. The habitat consists of unnatural grasslands such as pastures, forest margins and cleared forests.

References

Butterflies described in 1937
Astictopterini